Pacificulla is a genus of moths in the family Lecithoceridae. The genus was described by Park in 2013.

Species
 Pacificulla callisomata Park, 2013
 Pacificulla cervicalis Park, 2013
 Pacificulla esdiparki Park, 2013
 Pacificulla flaviagra Park, 2013
 Pacificulla geniola (Meyrick, 1931)
 Pacificulla ignigera (Meyrick, 1938)
 Pacificulla kekamatana Park, 2013
 Pacificulla miltina (Durrant, 1915)
 Pacificulla searsi Park, 2013
 Pacificulla thrasydora (Meyrick, 1910)
 Pacificulla philotima (Diakonoff, 1954)
 Pacificulla zonias (Meyrick, 1904)

References

Park, K. T. & Lee, S. M. (2013). "Pacificulla gen. nov. of Lecithoceridae (Lepidoptera, Gelechioidea) from New Guinea, with descriptions of six new species". Zootaxa. 3599 (1): 67-77.

 
Moth genera
Moths of Oceania
Lecithoceridae